Young Husbands is a 1958 Italian comedy film directed by Mauro Bolognini. It was entered into the 1958 Cannes Film Festival. For this film Armando Nannuzzi won a Silver Ribbon (Nastro d'Argento) for Best Cinematography.

Cast
 Anne-Marie Baumann as Fanny
 Gérard Blain as Marcello
 Guido Celano as Franco's father
 Roberto Chevalier as Checchino
 Antonio Cifariello as Ettore
 Isabelle Corey as Laura
 Ennio Girolami as Franco
 Anna Maria Guarnieri as Ornella
 Franco Interlenghi as Antonio
 Sylva Koscina as Mara
 Antonella Lualdi as Lucia
 Lilly Mantovani as Lily
 Raf Mattioli as Giulio
 Rosy Mazzacurati as Donatella
 Lila Rocco as Gilda
 Marcella Rovena as Franco's mother

References

External links

1958 films
Films scored by Nino Rota
1950s Italian-language films
1958 comedy films
Italian black-and-white films
Films directed by Mauro Bolognini
Films set in Tuscany
Commedia all'italiana
1950s Italian films